The Cabinet of Ministers of Venezuela ( is one of the bodies that make up the Venezuelan executive in that country's presidential system, alongside the Council of Ministers. The Cabinet is headed by the President of Venezuela, and his corresponding Vice President. The purpose of the ministries is to create, adopt, follow and evaluate policies, strategies, programs and projects in accordance with the constitution and the laws of the Republic.

Structure

The President of the Republic, the Executive Vice President and the Ministers, meeting jointly, make up the Council of Ministers.

Vice President of the Republic
It is a constitutional body of the National Executive, appointed by the President of the Republic.

Ministers
The Ministers are direct bodies of the President of the Republic, and meeting jointly with the President and the Executive Vice President, they make up the Council of Ministers.

Ministers have the right to speak before the National Assembly and the Committees thereof. They have the right to take part in debates in the National Assembly, without the right to vote.

List of Ministers
The structure as of 2020:
President of the Council of Ministers of the Bolivarian Republic of Venezuela
First Vice-President of the Council of Ministers of the Bolivarian Republic of Venezuela
Sector Vice-president for the Economy
Sector Vice President for Planning
Sector Vice-President for Social and Territorial Socialism
Sector Vice President for Political Sovereignty, Security and Peace
Sector Vice President for Communication and Culture
Sector Vice President for Public Works and Services
Permanent Secretary of the Council of Ministers of the Bolivarian Republic of Venezuela
Attorney General of the Bolivarian Republic of Venezuela

Procuraduría General de la República
The Office of the Attorney General of the Republic advises, defends and represents in and out of court the property interests of the Republic, and must be consulted for purposes of approval of contracts in the national public interest. 

The Office of the Attorney General of the Republic is responsible to and under the overall direction of the Attorney General. The Attorney General attends and has the right to speak at meetings of the Cabinet.

Council of State
The Council of State is the highest consultative organ of the Government and the National Public Administration. It is charged with making policy recommendations in the national interest with regard to matters recognized by the President as being of particular importance and requiring the Council's opinion.  

The Council of State is led by the Vice President as chairperson and has the following composition:

 5 members appointed by the President
 1 member appointed by the Directorial Board of the National Assembly
 1 member appointed by the Chief Justice of the Supreme Tribunal
 1 state governor selected by all the state and territorial governors to represent states' matters

Federal Council of Government
It is the body in charge of coordinating and planning policies and transferring competencies from the National Power to the States and Municipalities.

As a plenary section the FCG is made up of:

 Vice President of the Republic (President).
 Ministers of the Cabinet
 Governors of each federal entity (including governors of Amazonas, Anzoátegui, Apure, Aragua, Barinas, Bolívar, Carabobo, Cojedes, Delta Amacuro, Falcón, Guárico, Lara, Mérida, Miranda, Monagas, Nueva Esparta, Portuguesa, Sucre, Táchira, Trujillo, Vargas, Yaracuy and Zulia)
 One Mayor from the states representing municipal governments
 Spokespersons of the People's Power elected by regions

It also has a Permanent Secretariat, with the Executive Vice-Presidency of the Republic, two ministers, three governors, and three mayors forming its membership.

Other executive bodies
Capital District Government
Government of the Miranda Island Territory
Central Bank of Venezuela

Cabinet of Nicolás Maduro

Cabinet of Juan Guaidó

Cabinet of Hugo Chávez

Former cabinets
 Cabinet of Hermógenes López
 Cabinet of Cipriano Castro
 Cabinet of Eleazar López Contreras
 Cabinet of Isaías Medina Angarita
 Cabinet of Rómulo Gallegos
 Cabinet of Marcos Pérez Jiménez
 Cabinet of Rómulo Betancourt
Second presidency of Rómulo Betancourt
 Cabinet of Raúl Leoni
 Cabinet of Luis Herrera Campins
 Cabinet of Jaime Lusinchi
 Cabinet of Carlos Andrés Pérez
 Cabinet of Ramón José Velásquez
 Cabinet of Rafael Caldera
 Cabinet of Hugo Chávez
 Cabinet of Nicolás Maduro

See also
 Venezuelan Politics
 Venezuelan Constitution of 1999
 Territorial organization of Venezuela
 History of Venezuela

References

External links
Gobierno en línea - Official website of the Venezuelan government.

Government ministers of Venezuela
Venezuela